Sorkheban-e Olya (also Romanized as Sorkhebān-e ‘Olyā; also known as Sorkhbān) is a village in Sharvineh Rural District, Kalashi District, Javanrud County, Kermanshah Province, Iran. At the 2006 census, its population was 67, in 17 families.

References 

Populated places in Javanrud County